Julián Alberto Velázquez (born 23 October 1990) is an Argentine professional footballer who plays as a centre-back in Club Jorge Wilstermann.

Career
Velázquez debuted with Independiente aged 19 in a 1–0 home win over Gimnasia y Esgrima La Plata, for the 13th fixture of the 2009 Apertura. Under Américo Gallego's coaching, he started the game as a left back replacing Lucas Mareque (who was suspended).

In 2010, he was a regular for Independiente in their Copa Sudamericana winning campaign, scoring two goals in the competition (one in the final against Goiás).

In July 2012 he was about to join Italian club Genoa. However, as the club had spent a non-EU signing quota from abroad on Anselmo de Moraes, the deal collapsed.

In January 2015, Velázquez signed with Italian Serie A club Palermo. He immediately went out on loan to Romanian club Gaz Metan Mediaș.

On the 12th of August 2015, Julian Velazquez was confirmed to be the newest signing of 1. HNL giants HNK Hajduk Split, signing a one-year deal. He was the first Argentinian to play for the Croatian club.
He proved to be a great player for Hajduk and became instantly a first team regular but injuries prevented him from playing even more. On 7 June 2016, his loan at Hajduk Split ended.

International career
He made his debut with the national team on April 20, 2011 on the occasion of the friendly match against Ecuador equalized 2-2.

Honours

Club
Independiente
Copa Sudamericana (1): 2010

References

External links
 
 

Living people
1990 births
Argentine footballers
Argentine expatriate footballers
Association football central defenders
Club Atlético Independiente footballers
CS Gaz Metan Mediaș players
Palermo F.C. players
Cruz Azul footballers
HNK Hajduk Split players
Club Tijuana footballers
Querétaro F.C. footballers
Talleres de Córdoba footballers
Rosario Central footballers
Argentine Primera División players
Primera Nacional players
Liga I players
Liga MX players
Croatian Football League players
Argentina international footballers
Argentine expatriate sportspeople in Italy
Argentine expatriate sportspeople in Croatia
Argentine expatriate sportspeople in Romania
Argentine expatriate sportspeople in Mexico
Expatriate footballers in Italy
Expatriate footballers in Croatia
Expatriate footballers in Romania
Expatriate footballers in Mexico
People from Corrientes
Sportspeople from Corrientes Province